Posta Rangers Football Club is a Kenyan professional football club, based in Nairobi, which currently competes in the Kenyan Premier League. It competes in the Kenyan Premier League and competed in the 2012 KPL Top 8 Cup, where they were knocked out by Tusker.

The club was known as Posta Rangers Football Club from its establishment until the end of the 2011 season, from when it was known as Rangers Football Club until the end of the 2012 season, after which it was renamed Posta Rangers Football Club.

External links
Posta Rangers FC at soka.co.ke (archived on October 2, 2015)

References

 

Kenyan Premier League clubs
Kenyan National Super League clubs
FKF Division One clubs
Football clubs in Kenya
Works association football clubs in Kenya